Fiskerton may refer to:

 Fiskerton, Lincolnshire
 RAF Fiskerton, a Royal Air Force station near the village
 Fiskerton, Nottinghamshire

See also
 
 Fisherton (disambiguation)